Matanza Inc is a Brazilian rock band formed by former members of Matanza.

History 
In May 2018, Matanza announced they would end the band in October of the same year due to "matters that need to be dealt with, professional possibilities that need to be contemplated and artistic needs that [...] take to distinct paths".

On 11 January 2019, the former members of the band, without London, announced their reunion with vocalist Vital Cavalcante, forming a new band named Matanza Inc.

Members 
 Vital Cavalcante – vocals (2019–present)
 Maurício Nogueira – lead and rhythm guitar (2019–present)
 Marco Donida – lead and rhythm guitar (2019–present)
 Dony Escobar – bass (2019–present)
 Jonas – drums(2019–present)

Discography 
Studio albums
 2019 - Crônicas do Post Mortem: Um Guia Para Demônios e Espíritos Obsessores

References

Musical groups established in 2019
Brazilian rock music groups
Brazilian hardcore punk groups
Brazilian punk rock groups
Musical quintets
2019 establishments in Brazil